It Did Make a Difference is the discography album of one of Sweden's first hardcore punk band, Step Forward. It is the complete discography of the band, released on CD. Being one of the few hardcore punk bands of Sweden back in 1989, their fast and energetic tunes were the starting point of Sweden's hardcore scene. Members of this band went to form bands like Refused and others.

Track listing
Does It Make A Difference Recordings (1990)
Away 
For myself 
Think ahead 
Nothing to say 
My love
Deal with it
3 mil till Vännäs
Does it make a difference
The dream
Killing for profit
Filler (Minor Threat cover)

I Am Me Recordings (1989)
Change today
Stop the madness
A point of view
I am me
False people
Face the reality
Tomorrows world
4 u
Steppin stone (The Monkees cover) 
It isn't funny at all
Try
I am me
The dream
4 u
We're gonna fight (7 Seconds cover)

Live Recordings
What do you say Moe?
A point of view
Nothing to say
Feeding the fire
Hide from truth
Does it make a difference?
Seeing is believing
Racial hatred
My love
My life
Mommy can I go out and kill tonight? (Misfits cover)

Rehearsal Recordings
Step forward
Something else

Personnel 
Dennis Lyxzén - lead vocals, layout, production, master
 Toft Stade - bass, layout, production, master 
 Jens Norden - drums, percussion
 Henrik Janson - guitar
 José Saxlund - layout
 Eskil - production, mastering
 Jonas Lyxzén - photos

1989 albums
Step Forward albums